New Forces may refer to:
Forces Nouvelles de Côte d'Ivoire
New Democratic Force
New Democratic Forces

See also
New Force (disambiguation)